Banfélé  is a town and sub-prefecture in the Kouroussa Prefecture in the Kankan Region of eastern-central Guinea. As of 2014 it had a population of 24,555 people.

References

Sub-prefectures of the Kankan Region